The Disposable American: Layoffs and Their Consequences  is a 2006 book written by  New York Times reporter Louis Uchitelle, and it was his first. It was published by Alfred A. Knopf, Inc. The book is concerned with what the author sees as the far reaching layoffs occurring in the United States, the damage he perceives this causes the country, and the psychological harm he perceives dealt to workers by this phenomenon. According to the book's author, Louis Uchitelle, the waves of major layoffs are injurious to the United States through three key results: the phenomenon disadvantages companies, thus leaving them unable to compete, it has removed numerous middle class jobs, and it disadvantages former middle class workers who are often forced to work lower paying jobs.

References

Further reading
 Gerena, Charles (Spring 2007). "Job Security No Longer Job One". Region Focus. Book Review: 'The Disposable American: Layoffs and Their Consequences - by Louis Uchitelle'. Free PDF download.

External links
 "Book Discussion on The Disposable American: Layoffs and Their Consequences". C-SPAN. Video. August 17, 2006.

American non-fiction books
Sociology books
Alfred A. Knopf books
2006 non-fiction books
Termination of employment